The 2012 San Marino and Rimini Riviera motorcycle Grand Prix was the thirteenth round of the 2012 Grand Prix motorcycle racing season. It took place on the weekend of 14–16 September 2012 at the Misano World Circuit Marco Simoncelli.

Classification

MotoGP

Moto2
The Moto2 race was stopped after 3 laps due to an oil spill from Gino Rea's bike. It was restarted and reduced to 14 laps, with the starting grid determined by the running order in the first part. The final result was determined by the second part.

Moto3

Championship standings after the race (MotoGP)
Below are the standings for the top five riders and constructors after round thirteen has concluded.

Riders' Championship standings

Constructors' Championship standings

 Note: Only the top five positions are included for both sets of standings.

References

San Marino and Rimini Riviera motorcycle Grand Prix
San Marino
San Marino and Rimini
San Marino and Rimini Riviera motorcycle Grand Prix